Suri Assembly constituency is an assembly constituency in Birbhum district in the Indian state of West Bengal.

Overview
As per orders of the Delimitation Commission, No. 285, Suri Assembly constituency is composed of the following: Suri municipality, Suri I CD Block, Rajnagar CD Block, and Chinpai, Gohaliara, Parulia and Sahapur gram panchayats of Dubrajpur CD Block.

Suri Assembly constituency is part of No. 42 Birbhum (Lok Sabha constituency).

Election results

2021

2016

2011
In the 2011 election, Swapan Kanti Ghosh of Trinamool Congress defeated his nearest rival Abdul Ghaffar of CPI(M).

 

.# Swing calculated on Congress+Trinamool Congress vote percentages taken together in 2006.

1977-2006
In the 2006 state assembly elections Tapan Roy of CPI(M) won the Suri assembly seat defeating his nearest rival Swapan Kanti Ghosh of Congress. Contests in most years were multi cornered but only winners and runners are being mentioned. Braja Mukherjee of CPI(M) defeated Suniti Chattaraj of Trinamool Congress in 2001. Suniti Chattaraj of Congress defeated Tapan Roy of CPI(M) in 1996. Tapan Roy of CPI(M) defeated Suniti Chattaraj of Congress in 1991 and 1987. Suniti Chattaraj of Congress defeated Keshab Das of CPI(M) in 1982 and Arun Kumar Chowdhury in 1977.

1951–1972
Suniti Chattaraj of Congress won in 1972. Prativa Mukherjee of SUC in 1971 and 1969. Baidyanath Bandopadhyay of Congress won in 1967 and 1962. In 1957 and 1951 Suri was a joint seat with one seat being reserved for scheduled tribes. Turku Hansda of CPI and Mihirlal Chatterjee of PSP won in 1957. Nishapati Majhi and Gopika Bilas Sengupta, both of Congress, won in 1951.

References

Assembly constituencies of West Bengal
Politics of Birbhum district